Rachelia is the scientific name of two genera of organisms and may refer to:

Rachelia (butterfly), a genus of insects in the family Hesperiidae
Rachelia (plant), a genus of plants in the family Asteraceae